Feminism WTF is a 2023 Austrian documentary film about feminism and gender equality, written, produced and directed by Katharina Mückstein. The documentary had its world premiere at the CPH:DOX in Copenhagen on 18 March 2023. It will be released theatrically in Austria by Stadtkino Filmverleih on 31 March 2023.

Plot
Based on an idea by director Katharina Mückstein and Ina Freudensprung, Feminism WTF is dedicated to the documentary examination of feminism and gender equality.

Cast 
 Christoph May
 Laura Wiesböck
 Emilene Wopana Mudimu	
 Roni Toren
 Maisha Auma
 Astrid Biele Mefebue
 Nikita Dhawan
 Paula Villa Braslavsky
 Persson Perry Baumgartinger
 Sigrid Schmidt
 Franziska Schutzbach

Production 
On 29 November 2018, it was announced that director Katharina Mückstein had received support from the Vienna Film Fund for a documentary entitled Feminism WTF. The "WTF" in the title stands for "What The Fuck".

The documentary was co-produced by La Banda Film and Nikolaus Geyrhalter Filmproduktion, with the support of Österreichisches Filminstitut, Filmfonds Wien, ORF Film/Fernsehabkommen and FISA - Filmstandort Austria. Filming took place in Vienna, Austria.

FM4 included the film on its list of "32 films to look forward to in 2023".

Marketing 
The first official trailer was released on 16 February 2023.

References

External links 
 
 

2023 films
2023 documentary films
Austrian documentary films
2020s German-language films
Austrian independent films
Documentary films about feminism
Films about activists
Feminism in Austria
Films shot in Vienna
Films directed by Katharina Mückstein